The 2017 Formula Renault Eurocup is a multi-event motor racing championship for open wheel, formula racing cars held across Europe. The championship features drivers competing in 2 litre Formula Renault single seat race cars that conform to the technical regulations for the championship. The 2017 season is the 27th Formula Renault Eurocup season organized by the Renault Sport and the second season as the main category of the World Series by Renault. The series will visit ten circuits around the Europe, including Monaco.

Teams and drivers
Twelve teams were preselected on 12 September 2016. ASM Motorsport, Cram Motorsport and Duqueine Engineering were dropped from the final teams' list that was published on 9 November 2016.

Driver changes
 French F4 champion Ye Yifei and 2016 F4 British Championship driver Luis Leeds made their Eurocup debut with Josef Kaufmann Racing. They were partnered by Sacha Fenestraz who left Tech 1 Racing. While Eurocup champion Lando Norris and his teammate Jehan Daruvala, who raced for Josef Kaufmann racing in 2016, stepped up to 2017 FIA Formula 3 European Championship. 
 F4 British Champion Max Fewtrell, 2016 BRDC British Formula 3 Championship driver Thomas Maxwell and 2016 V de V Challenge Monoplace driver Thomas Neubauer joined Tech 1 Racing. While 2016 Tech 1 regular Dorian Boccolacci moved to 2017 GP3 Series. Another 2016 Tech 1 regular Hugo de Sadeleer left single-seaters to join United Autosports in LMP2 class of the 2017 European Le Mans Series.
 French F4 Championship driver Raúl Guzmán competed for R-ace GP, he was joined in the team by Robert Shwartzman, who previously raced for Josef Kaufmann Racing. While 2016 R-ace GP racer Julien Falchero graduated to GP3 Series.
 Panam GP Series champion Axel Matus and V de V Challenge Monoplace driver Gregoire Saucy made their debuts for AVF by Adrián Vallés. They was joined by Rodrigo Pflucker who has competed two rounds with Cram Motorsport. 2016 AVF regular Harrison Scott decided to switch to 2017 Euroformula Open Championship.
 V de V Challenge Monoplace champion Alex Peroni and 2016 Asian Formula Renault Series driver Najiy Razak made their Eurocup debut with Fortec Motorsports. Aleksey Korneev switched from JD Motorsport to Fortec. While Bruno Baptista and Ferdinand Habsburg, who raced for Fortec in 2016 moved to GP3 Series and FIA Formula 3 European Championship respectively.
 JD Motorsport signed all-rookie line-up with Sun Yueyang and Jean-Baptiste Simmenauer who jumped straight from the karting. They also took 2016 SMP F4 Championship driver Aleksandr Vartanyan, who also have contested 2016 Eurocup finale with Fortec. James Allen who raced for JD Motorsport in 2016 decided to switch to sports car racing, joining Graff Racing
 Mark Burdett Motorsport team were joined by Formula 4 South East Asia champion Presley Martono and 2016 Formula Renault 2.0 Northern European Cup driver Julia Pankiewicz.
 MP Motorsport squad was staffed by SMP F4 and F4 Spanish champion Richard Verschoor, F1600 Championship Series driver and another Red Bull Junior Neil Verhagen and Verschoor's SMP F4 title rival Jarno Opmeer.
 Arden signed with Red Bull Junior driver Dan Ticktum, Formula Renault 2.0 NEC driver Ghislain Cordeel and F4 British Championship driver Zane Goddard.

Race calendar
The provisional calendar for the 2017 season was announced on 17 October 2016. The series will return Silverstone Circuit, Hungaroring, Nürburgring and Circuit de Barcelona-Catalunya and add Pau Circuit in its schedule. While Ciudad del Motor de Aragón for the first time since 2009 will be not present in the 2017 calendar, as well as 2016 returnee Autódromo Fernanda Pires da Silva. On 3 February 2017 was confirmed the number of the races during the rounds.

Results

Footnotes

Championship standings
The first race at Spa which held in fog conditions was red-flagged after three laps were completed behind the safety car, but before 75% of the scheduled distance in laps, the necessary distance required for a race to pay full points. Race paid half points to all classified finishers.

Points system
Points were awarded to the top 10 classified finishers.

Drivers' championship
(key)

Teams' championship
Only two best-finishing cars are allowed to score points in the championship.

References

External links
 Renault-Sport official website

Formula Renault
Formula Renault
Formula Renault seasons
Renault Eurocup